The 2013 Porsche Carrera Cup Italia season was the seventh Porsche Carrera Cup Italy season. It began on 4 May at Misano and finished on 20 October in Monza, after seven events with two races at each event. Enrico Fulgenzi won the drivers' championship driving for Heaven Motorsport, which won the teams' championship.

Teams and drivers

Race calendar and results

Championship standings

Drivers' Championship

† — Drivers did not finish the race, but were classified as they completed over 75% of the race distance.

   - Gianluca Giraudi was awarded the point for the fastest lap because Matthieu Vaxivière was inelegible to score points.
   - Gianluca Giraudi was awarded the two points for pole position because Côme Ledogar was inelegible to score points.
   - Gianluca Giraudi was awarded the point for the fastest lap because Maxime Jousse was inelegible to score points.
   - Massimo Monti was awarded the point for the fastest lap because Jim Pla was inelegible to score points.

Teams' Championship

† — Drivers did not finish the race, but were classified as they completed over 75% of the race distance.

Michelin Cup
The Michelin Cup is the trophy reserved to the gentlemen drivers.

External links
 

Porsche Carrera Cup Italy seasons
Porsche Carrera Cup Italy